Michael McCreadie (born 16 March 1946, in Glasgow) is a Paralympian with successes in lawn bowls and wheelchair curling. He made his debut at the 1972 Summer Paralympics in Heidelberg as a swimmer. He won two bronze medals in lawn bowls at the 1976 Summer Paralympics. He also competed in swimming and wheelchair basketball at the same Games and captained the British wheelchair basketball team at the 1980 Summer Paralympics. After that he coached the British wheelchair basketball team at the 1988 and 1992 Summer Paralympics.

In 2001 he took up wheelchair curling after trying the sport at his local rink at Braehead. He was part of the Scotland rink which won a bronze at the 2002 and 2007 World Wheelchair Curling Championship, gold at the 2004 and 2005 World Championship, and was on the silver medal-winning team at the 2006 Winter Paralympics. He was the skip for the British team in Wheelchair curling at the 2010 Winter Paralympics and carried the British flag in the opening ceremony.

His disability was caused by poliomyelitis, which he contracted in 1947.

His partner is former teammate and successor as skip of the British Paralympic rink Aileen Neilson.

References

External links

Profile at the Official Website for the 2010 Winter Paralympics in Vancouver

1946 births
Living people
Scottish male curlers
Scottish male bowls players
Sportspeople from Glasgow
Medalists at the 2006 Winter Paralympics
Paralympic lawn bowls players of Great Britain
Lawn bowls players at the 1976 Summer Paralympics
Paralympic wheelchair curlers of Great Britain
Wheelchair curlers at the 2006 Winter Paralympics
Wheelchair curlers at the 2010 Winter Paralympics
Paralympic silver medalists for Great Britain
Paralympic bronze medalists for Great Britain
Scottish disabled sportspeople
Scottish Paralympic competitors
Paralympic wheelchair basketball coaches
Scottish sports coaches
Medalists at the 1976 Summer Paralympics
World wheelchair curling champions
Paralympic medalists in lawn bowls
Paralympic medalists in wheelchair curling
Scottish wheelchair curlers